Bebe Cave (born 22 July 1997) is an English actress.

Early life
Cave was born 22 July 1997 in London, England, the youngest of five siblings, to two general practitioners. Her older sister Jessie Cave is an actress and comedian.

Career
Cave made her acting debut in 2009 in the made-for-television movie called May Contain Nuts. In 2012 Cave was cast as Young Biddy alongside her sister in the 2012 film Great Expectations. In 2013 she starred opposite Helen Mirren in the 2013 play The Audience.     The Daily Telegraph described her as a "revelation" who gives a "performance of blistering pathos and real comic punch." She was cast in Tale of Tales by director Matteo Garrone after seeing her appear in a YouTube red carpet interview. She starred in Tom Rosenthal's 2019 music video, "You Might Find Yours."

Filmography

Film

Television

Theatre

References

External links

1997 births
Living people
Actresses from London
English film actresses
English television actresses
21st-century English actresses